Luke Dyer (born ) is a former rugby league footballer who played in the 2000s and 2010s.

Background
Dyer was born in Penrith, New South Wales, Australia.

Playing career
Dyer played for the Melbourne Storm in the 2004 Rugby League World Sevens pre-season tournament. He was later released by Melbourne, returning to Penrith Panthers during the 2004 NRL season, making his NRL debut for Penrith against Melbourne in round 17.

Dyer represented for Wales in Rugby League World Cup qualifying matches.

Dyer scored the Crusaders first and only try in their first game in the Super League.

References

External links
(archived by web.archive.org) Statistics at thecastlefordtigers.co.uk

1981 births
Living people
Australian people of Welsh descent
Australian rugby league players
Castleford Tigers players
Central Queensland Capras players
Crusaders Rugby League players
Hull Kingston Rovers players
Penrith Panthers players
Rugby league centres
Rugby league players from Penrith, New South Wales
Rugby league wingers
Wales national rugby league team players